Frederick John Burton (2 November 1865 – 25 August 1929) was a wicket-keeper who played first-class cricket for New South Wales, Victoria and in two Test matches in the 1880s for Australia.

He later lived in New Zealand where he was an established cricket umpire.

References

External links

1865 births
1929 deaths
Australia Test cricketers
New South Wales cricketers
Victoria cricketers
Australian cricket umpires
Melbourne Cricket Club cricketers
Australian cricketers
Cricketers from Victoria (Australia)
Wicket-keepers

mr:फ्रेडरिक बर्टन